William and Dorothy is a 1978 British TV movie directed by Ken Russell.

It was screened with The Rime of the Ancient Mariner as Clouds of Glory. The Los Angeles Times called it "flat out brilliant".

Cast
David Warner as William Wordsworth
Felicity Kendall as Dorothy Wordsworth

References

External links

1978 television films
1978 films
Films directed by Ken Russell